William Christie Benet Jr. (December 26, 1879 – March 30, 1951) was a Democratic Party politician who briefly represented the state of South Carolina in the United States Senate in 1918.

Early years
Benet was born in Abbeville, South Carolina; he attended the common schools in his youth, and matriculated at the College of Charleston, the University of South Carolina, and the University of Virginia, where he graduated in 1902.

Football
He played college football as a guard at South Carolina and was a star tackle for Virginia, selected All-Southern in 1901.

Benet coached football at South Carolina in 1903 and 1907. He assisted coach and Virginia teammate Bob Williams in 1902, when Carolina upset John Heisman's Clemson team.

Law career
He studied the law, and upon his admission to the bar began practice in Columbia, South Carolina, in 1903.  Solicitor of the fifth judicial circuit in 1908, Benet became Columbia's city attorney from 1910 to 1912.  He was the secretary of the Democratic State committee three times.

Senator
On July 6, 1918 he was appointed to the Senate to fill out the term of Benjamin R. Tillman, who died in office.  He served until November 5, when a successor to the position was elected; Benet himself was an unsuccessful candidate in the same election to fill the vacancy.  During his brief time in the Senate, Benet was the chairman of the Committee on National Banks; upon his defeat, he resumed his practice.

State hospital
From 1915 he was a member of the board of regents of the South Carolina State Hospital, later becoming the chairman of the board; in this capacity he served until 1946.

War and death

World War II
During World War II Benet chaired the War Finance Committee for South Carolina.

Death
He was serving as the chairman of the Alien Enemy Hearing Board for the state's eastern district at his death; he died in Columbia, and was interred locally in Elmwood Cemetery. Benet Hall, a residence hall at Clemson University, is named in his honor.

Head coaching record

References

External links
 
 

1879 births
1951 deaths
American athlete-politicians
American football guards
American football tackles
Clemson University trustees
Democratic Party United States senators from South Carolina
South Carolina Democrats
South Carolina state solicitors
South Carolina Gamecocks athletic directors
South Carolina Gamecocks football coaches
South Carolina Gamecocks football players
Virginia Cavaliers football coaches
Virginia Cavaliers football players
College of Charleston alumni
All-Southern college football players
University of South Carolina alumni
People from Abbeville, South Carolina
Coaches of American football from South Carolina
Players of American football from South Carolina